{{Infobox company
|name=Subatomic Studios
|logo=
|type=
|company_slogan=
|foundation=2008
|location=Cambridge, United States
|key_people=
Jamie Gotch, CEO
Sergei Gourski, CFO
Leo Montenegro, CCO

|industry=Video games
|num_employees= 18 |
|products=Fieldrunners  
Tinkerbox 
Fieldrunners 2

|homepage=subatomicstudios
}}

Subatomic Studios is an independent video game developer with offices in Cambridge, Massachusetts in the United States. It was best known for developing the tower defense game Fieldrunners series.

History
Subatomic Studios was founded in 2008 by industry veterans Jamie Gotch, Leonardo Montenegro and Sergei Gourski.

Games
 Fieldrunners Tinkerbox
 Fieldrunners 2''

References

External links
Official website
"Subatomic Studios brings Fieldrunners to DSiWare" from Frisky Mongoose
"Fieldrunners 2 dashes to iPhone in June"

Video game development companies
Video game companies established in 2008
Video game companies of the United States
Companies based in Massachusetts
2008 establishments in Massachusetts